Mangalore Special Economic Zone or MSEZ is a Special Economic Zone spread across 1,600 acres in Mangalore, Karnataka, India

MSEZ is managed by Mangalore Special Economic Zone Limited(MSEZL).

MSEZL is jointly promoted by Oil & Natural Gas Corporation (ONGC), a Fortune 500 Company and Infrastructure Leasing & Finance Services (IL&FS), Karnataka Industrial Area Development Board (KIADB) and Kanara Chamber of Commerce and Industry (KCCI). A unique combination of Government entities, a large financial institution and an apex chamber brings in the expertise to develop MSEZL with world-class industrial infrastructure.

References 

Special Economic Zones of India
Economy of Mangalore
Oil and Natural Gas Corporation